Daraj-e Sofla may refer to:
Daraj-e Sofla, East Azerbaijan ( - Darāj-e Soflá)
Daraj-e Sofla, South Khorasan ( - Dāraj-e Soflá)